Zenobia Galar (born Zenobia Terrero Galarza; 3 May 1958) is a Dominican painter.

Biography
Zenobia Terrero Galarza was born in Enriquillo, Barahona on 3 May 1958, the daughter of professor Elena Galarza de Terrero and the musician and soldier Francisco Corpus Terrero.

She is considered an important canvas artist in the Dominican Republic, and her works are part of multiple private collections in her country and abroad. She studied graphic and advertising arts at the School of Arts of the Universidad Autónoma de Santo Domingo (UASD), where she also studied the history of art and history of civilization.

Galar has served as a board member of the Dominican College of Plastic Artists, and was a painting teacher in its beginnings at educational institutions, as well as in its Painting Workshop, where she is still an instructor for both children and adults. She is also a lecturer and instructor in art subjects.

She has participated in various group exhibitions both locally and internationally in Spain and Colombia.

Style

Galar prefers acrylic and oil, but also uses mixed techniques, such as collage. Her style is based on figurative neo-expressionism.

According to the art analyst Marianne De Tolentino,

Individual exhibitions

Collective exhibitions

References

1958 births
20th-century Dominican Republic painters
Dominican Republic women painters
Living people
Neo-expressionist artists
People from Barahona Province
21st-century Dominican Republic artists
21st-century painters
20th-century women artists
21st-century women artists
Universidad Autónoma de Santo Domingo alumni